Leandro Eleutério de Souza or simply Leandrinho (born February 22, 1985 in Araruama), is a Brazilian right back. He currently plays for ASA.

External links

1985 births
Living people
Brazilian footballers
Campeonato Brasileiro Série A players
Cruzeiro Esporte Clube players
Agremiação Sportiva Arapiraquense players
São José Esporte Clube players
Esporte Clube Taubaté players
Marília Atlético Clube players
Campeonato Brasileiro Série C players
Sport Club Corinthians Alagoano players
Centro Sportivo Alagoano players
Boa Esporte Clube players
Campeonato Brasileiro Série B players
Association football defenders
People from Araruama